Jean Villard, known as Gilles (2 June 1895 in Montreux (Switzerland) – 26 March 1982 in Vevey), originating from Daillens, was a French Swiss multi-talented chansonnier, poet, humorist, comedian, actor, and cabaretist. He was friends with Édith Piaf, Ernest Ansermet, Jacques Brel, Jean Poiret, Michel Serrault and met also with  Charles-Ferdinand Ramuz. He gave his last interview in December 1981 at his home, where he confided that "I have always tried my best to be a poet."

One of Lausanne's parks, on the Avenue du Théâtre, now bears his name. He served in the Swiss Army during World War I in Soubey, Jura, recalling that he defended the bridge that crosses the river Doubs.

Roles at the Theatre 
 1919: L'histoire du soldat from Igor Stravinski and Charles Ferdinand Ramuz
 1920-1930: Several roles at the "Théâtre du Vieux-Colombier" in Paris, directed by Jacques Copeau
 1920: Cromedeyre-le-Vieil by  Jules Romains, directed by Jacques Copeau, Théâtre du Vieux-Colombier
 1930: Plays in « La Compagnie des Quinze »
 1931: La Mauvaise Conduite d'après Plaute, Théâtre du Vieux-Colombier

Chansonnier 
1932-1939 duo « Gilles et Julien », with A.-M. Julien (Aman Maistre (1903-2001)
1940-1948 duo with Édith Burger,
1948-1975 duo with Albert Urfer

Cabaret owner 
1940 : he founded the cabaret  « Coup de Soleil » in Lausanne with Edith Burger, an anti-Nazi, resistance, gathering place
1947 : he founded the cabaret « Chez Gilles » in Paris
discovers Jacques Brel, then an unknown beginner whom he immediately hired.
1955 : « Chez Gilles » in Lausanne

Some well-known works 
1932: Dollar, first « chanson française engagée » of the 20th century
1936: La Belle France the anthem of the French Resistance Popular Front
1940: Les trois cloches interpreted by Édith Piaf with Les Compagnons de la chanson
1940: 14 juillet
1948: Le Bonheur
1951: A L'Enseigne de la Fille Sans Cœur interpreted by Édith Piaf
1954: La Venoge
1958: Nos Colonels

Books 
1943, « Les Histoires de Gilles »
1954, « Mon demi siècle », Librérie Payot
1960, « La Venoge et autres poèmes » - images by Géa Augsburg, Editions du Verseau et Librairie Payot, Lausanne
1963, « Chansons que tout cela !», (Le meilleur de Gilles », tome I)
1969, « Mon demi siècle et demi », Payot
1971, « Le dernier mot », (Le meilleur de Gilles", tome II)
1978, « Amicalement vôtre, Récits, chansons et souvenir », Editions Pierre-Marcel Favre

Plays at the Théâtre du Jorat Mézières 
1950  « Passage de l'étoile »
1960  « La Grange aux Roud »

Bibliography 
Albert Urfer, Qui va piano..., 1978
Alex Décotte, Le siècle de Gilles, 1995
Le meilleur de Gilles (3 volumes), Publi-Libris, 2003

Notes

External links 
Bibliographie
Poésie La Venoge de Jean Villard-Gilles and much valuable information on "Vaudois" language. (This oeuvre is an integral part of the collective memory of a citizen of the canton of Vaud, as they were taught to recite it by heart at school from an early age).
 Vidéo Jean Villard Gilles chante et raconte des histoires vaudoises, des vidéos du site des archives de la TSR Télévision Suisse Romande TSR

1895 births
1982 deaths
People from Montreux
Swiss poets in French
Swiss male poets
Swiss male stage actors
Swiss military personnel
20th-century Swiss poets
20th-century male writers
20th-century Swiss male singers